Spicer-Millard House is a historic home located at Barrington in Yates County, New York. It is a five- by two-bay Federal style residence built about 1819.

It was listed on the National Register of Historic Places in 1994.

References

Houses on the National Register of Historic Places in New York (state)
Federal architecture in New York (state)
Houses in Yates County, New York
National Register of Historic Places in Yates County, New York